Hu Hesheng (born 20 June 1928) is a Chinese mathematician. She served as vice-president of Chinese Mathematical Society, president of the Shanghai Mathematical Society, and is an academician of Chinese Academy of Science. She held the Noether Lecture in 2002.

Education and career
Born in Shanghai, Hu studied mathematics at National Chiao Tung University (now Shanghai Jiaotong University) and Great China University. She received her master's degree in mathematics from Zhejiang University in 1952, under the supervision of Su Buqing. During 1952-1956, she was a researcher at the Institute of Mathematics of the Chinese Academy of Sciences. 1956, she began working as a lecturer at Fudan University in Shanghai, later becoming an associate professor and eventually achieving full-time professorship.

Service and recognition
Hu served as vice president of the Chinese Mathematical Society and president of the Shanghai Mathematical Society. In 2002, she was chosen as the Emmy Noether Lecturer for that year's International Congress of Mathematicians in Beijing, China. She was elected as an academician of the Chinese Academy of Sciences in 1991 and as an academician of the Third World Academy of Science in 2003.

Research
Her main academic interests are differential geometry and mathematical physics. She led a research group at Fudan University during the 1980s and 1990s.

Personal
Hu's husband was Gu Chaohao, also a mathematician, who served as the president of University of Science and Technology of China. They were married until his death in 2012.

References

External links
 The Noether Lecturers
 Biographies of Women Mathematicians - Hu Hesheng
 Hu Hesheng's profile in the website of Chinese Academy of Science (Shanghai Branch)
 Hu Hesheng's profile in HLHL website
 Introduction from Fudan University
 Hu Hesheng's profile in People.com  (Chinese)

1928 births
Living people
20th-century women mathematicians
21st-century women mathematicians
Chinese women mathematicians
East China Normal University alumni
Educators from Shanghai
Academic staff of Fudan University
Mathematicians from Shanghai
Members of the Chinese Academy of Sciences
National Chiao Tung University (Shanghai) alumni
Zhejiang University alumni